Vera Jane Ellis-Crowther (27 August 1897 – 6 July 1983) was a Liverpool-born New Zealand nurse and midwife. An early advocate for the use of anaesthetic during childbirth, Ellis-Crowther operated the Waitemata Obstetric Hospital in Glen Eden, West Auckland from 1945 to 1954. Later in life, Ellis-Crowther became an advocate for home birthing, delivering over 1,000 home birth babies in New Zealand.

Biography 
Ellis-Crowther was born as Vera Jane Hodgson in Liverpool, England, on 27 August 1897. In 1924, Ellis-Crowther immigrated to New Zealand with her husband. Her husband had trained as a chemist, but when they arrived in New Zealand they worked on farms in Te Aroha, and later bought a 300 acre sharemilking farm at Maramarua. Her husband died in a truck accident in 1932, leading Ellis-Crowther to buy an orchard in Glen Eden, West Auckland. She retrained as a nurse and midwife at St Helens Hospital. While working at Huia Obstetric Hospital, Ellis-Crowther was inspired to move to Rawene, to work with a doctor who gave a talk on the use of Nembutal, an anaesthetic used in childbirth.

In 1938, Ellis-Crowther wrote an article in feminist magazine Woman To-day, arguing that the use of pain relief during childbirth was a human right. She believed that access to universal pain relief and maternity services were a class issue. Ellis-Crowther's views on anaesthetics were opposed by Grantly Dick-Read and other male doctors, who were advocating for anaesthesia-free natural childbirth.

Ellis-Crowther opened the Waitemata Obstetric Hospital on her land at Glen Eden in 1945. The hospital building was not ready at the time of opening, so Ellis-Crowther operated out of disused railway carriages. She sold the hospital in 1954, and after living in England for a period, returned to Auckland to work as a midwife.

Later in life, Ellis-Crowther became a convert to the home birth movement. In the 1970s, she was the only midwive who offered home-birth services. When she began to retire in the 1970s, Ellis-Crowther convinced midwives Joan Donley and Carolyn Young to leave hospitals and take over from her, to continue providing home birth services. When Ellis-Crowther retired as a midwife in 1974, at age 79, she had delivered over 1,000 home birth babies. Ellis-Crowther died on 6 July 1983 in Auckland.

Personal life 

Ellis-Crowther married Harry Linton Crowther in England in 1923. Their only daughter Joan was born on 2 May 1929 at Te Aroha. She married her second husband, David Ellis, in December 1941. She joined the Communist Party of New Zealand in the 1920s.

References

Bibliography

1897 births
1983 deaths
English emigrants to New Zealand
New Zealand midwives
New Zealand socialist feminists
New Zealand women nurses
New Zealand women's rights activists
Nurses from Liverpool
People from Liverpool
Women's rights activists from Liverpool
New Zealand communists